Name That Tune is an American television music game show. Originally created and produced by orchestra conductor Harry Salter and his wife Roberta Semple Salter, the series features contestants competing to correctly identify songs being played by an on-stage orchestra or band.

Name That Tune premiered on the NBC Radio Network in 1952, where it aired until 1954, and made the move to television in 1953 on the same network. CBS picked up the television series in the summer of 1953 and carried it through 1959.

A short-lived revival for syndication followed in 1970 with Richard Hayes as host, but a second revival in 1974 was much more successful. Airing weekly, the 1974 syndicated offering used a new show format and, beginning in 1976, offered a top prize of $100,000 to a lucky champion (after which the show became known as The $100,000 Name That Tune). Tom Kennedy hosted this series, which ran until 1981 and began airing twice weekly during its final season.

During the course of Kennedy’s series, two attempts were made at reviving the series for network television, both on its original home at NBC. Dennis James hosted the first of these series, which ran daily for five months in daytime in 1974 and came to an end shortly after the new year in 1975. In 1977, a second daily daytime series with Kennedy hosting was conceived, but this too was short-lived and was cancelled after six months.

Name That Tune returned in 1984 to syndication, again using the $100,000 prize in its branding. Hosted by Jim Lange, this revival was the first syndicated edition of Name That Tune not to air on a weekly basis from the start; instead, the show aired as a daily series with some changes to the format, including the tournament structure. It did not find the success that its predecessor had in syndication and came to an end after one season in 1985.

In November 2020, Prestige Entertainment, Eureka Productions, and Fox announced a new primetime version of Name That Tune hosted by actress Jane Krakowski (with Randy Jackson of American Idol fame as bandleader), which premiered on January 6, 2021. The twelve-episode first season was filmed in Australia with American contestants. A second season of the revival premiered on March 29, 2022, which was filmed in Ireland; in this season, four of the eight episodes featured celebrity contestants. A third season of the revival, titled Celebrity Name That Tune, premiered on January 11, 2023.

Background and production

Development 
Name That Tune had its conceptual origins in an earlier radio and television series, Stop the Music. Stop the Music was created by Mark Goodson, orchestra conductor Harry Salter, and advertising executive Howard Connell. Stop the Music relied on studio audience members and random telephone calls to potential viewers/listeners to identify melodies played by an orchestra. Name That Tune changed this idea to a head-to-head competition between two onstage contestants.

Incarnations of Name That Tune over the years have maintained core concepts. These include an orchestra and/or a band, head-to-head contestant identification of songs played by that orchestra/band, and a bonus round known as the "Golden Medley", where the winner of the head-to-head competition plays on their own for the episode's grand prize. Previous winners would sometimes be invited back to identify songs for much larger prizes – in the 1950s television version the prize was $25,000, and by the 1970s–1980s, this grand prize was increased to $100,000.

Orchestra, band, dancers 
Bob Alberti was the conductor of the orchestra for the first season of the 1970s run, with Tommy Oliver replacing him in 1975 and Stan Worth replacing Oliver in 1978. The orchestra also featured a vocalist at times. Originally the position was held by Kathie Lee Gifford, then known as Kathie Lee Johnson, who performed from 1977 to 1978. She was replaced by Monica Burruss for the 1978–79 season, who remained with the series until its 1981 cancellation.

Also for the 1978–79 season, the series brought in choreographers Dennon Rawles and Jerri Fiala, the latter of whom was already working for show producer Ralph Edwards as hostess on The Cross-Wits, to serve as background dancers; and the Name That Tune Orchestra (with Burruss) was supplemented by The Sound System, a rock music ensemble led by Dan Sawyer with Steve March as its featured vocalist. The dancers only appeared for one season, but The Sound System and March stayed on for the rest of the show's run.

In the 1984–85 series, Tommy Oliver returned to lead the orchestra.

The 2021 version sees musician, record executive and former American Idol judge Randy Jackson as bandleader. Jackson also performs announcing duties at the beginning of the show.

Gameplay

1950s version 
In the 1950s version of Name That Tune, the contestants stood across the stage from two large ship's bells as the orchestra started playing tunes. When a contestant knew the tune, they ran across the stage to "ring the bell and name that tune" Four tunes were played every game, and each tune was worth increasing dollar amounts. The first tune was worth $5 and each subsequent tune was worth double the previous tune, up to $40 for the fourth and final tune.  The player with the most money after four tunes won the game and played the "Golden Medley" bonus round. From 1955 to 1959, only three tunes were played, worth $10, $20 and $30. If both players were tied at $30 each, both played as a team in the Golden Medley.

Golden Medley 
In the original series, all the tunes played were selected by home viewers. Each correct tune won money for the winning contestant as well as the home viewers. The first correct answer was worth $25, and each subsequent correct answer doubled the money. Naming all seven won $1,600 and gave a home viewer a chance to come to the New York studio where the show was taped at that time, and play along with the studio contestant in a special round called the "Golden Medley Marathon".

The Golden Medley Marathon
In the Golden Medley Marathon, the winning home viewer and the winning studio contestant worked as a team. This time, the two players had to correctly guess five tunes in 30 seconds, and if they did so they split $10,000 and returned the next week to try and do it again. They could keep coming back for up to four additional weeks, and potentially could win a combined $50,000.

The top prize for the prime time CBS show, by 1959, was $25,000.

1974–81 version 
Two contestants selected from the studio audience compete in various song identification games to earn points as well as cash and prizes. Three rounds were played per game, typically beginning with Melody Roulette, followed by a second game which varied by-episode, and culminating with Bid-a-Note. Each of the first two games awarded 10 points to the winner, but Bid-a-Note was worth 20 points. A round's points were split between the players in the event of a tie. If the players were tied after the final competitive round, a single tiebreaker tune was played to determine who advanced to the Golden Medley bonus round for a chance at more prizes.

Melody Roulette 
A wheel was spun onstage to determine a cash prize for identifying the tune. Early in both the daytime and syndicated versions the wheel contained categories. Each contestant selected a category before each spin and received $100 if the wheel stopped on their choice. However, the categories were later replaced by money amounts ranging from $20 to $1,000 from 1974 to 1976, $50–$1,000 from 1976 to 1977, and $100–$1,000 from 1977 to 1981 on the syndicated series (and $50–$500 on the 1977 daytime series). Also, after the switch to dollar amounts on the wheel, each contestant selected a space on the wheel (a $100 space in daytime, a $200 space in the syndicated series). If the wheel landed on one of those spaces, that contestant won that amount automatically prior to the start of the tune; this was discarded in 1976.

An outer wheel was added in 1976 which held two spaces marked "Double" and was spun in the opposite direction of the inner. From 1977 to 1980, it also featured a space offering a new car, but the car could be won only once per episode. In 1980, this was replaced by two generic "prize" spaces, which worked the same way, along with only one Double space. In order for a tune to be worth double the value or to have a prize on the line, the corresponding space had to be covering the space where the inner wheel had stopped.

Both contestants kept the cash they earned.

Other games
These games were typically played during the second round:

 Build-a-Tune, played only on the short-lived 1977 daytime version, where the orchestra played a tune starting with minimal instrumentation and gradually added more until it became a full orchestral arrangement. Whoever named more tunes out of five received 10 points and a prize package. If both players were tied, each received five points and the prizes.
 Cassette Roulette, played during the first few months of the 1970s syndicated version, where contestants alternated selecting categories for songs from a board of eight 8-track tapes. Seven tunes were played, and the contestant who correctly named the most tunes won the round and 10 points.  Four of the cassettes also contained a bonus prize, which would be awarded to the contestant who correctly named the tune.
 The Money Tree, where the contestants were both given a "tree" with 100 $1 bills on it. While one contestant tried to guess a tune, their opponent would remove bills from it as quickly as possible until that contestant guessed correctly or ran out of time. The contestant with the most money left on their tree at the end of the round earned 10 points and a prize package, though it wasn't uncommon to see both trees stripped clean. The game was featured on the syndicated series from 1974 to 1977. It is also known to have been used at least once on the 1974 daytime series.
 Pick-a-Prize was another game played only on the 1977 daytime series, where the contestants were shown an assortment of prizes, then alternated between listening to tunes and trying to name them for a prize of their choice each time. The first player to name three tunes won the round and 10 points.
 Pick-a-Tune, where each tune would feature a list of words that included the words in the tune's title. Contestants eliminated words so that only the words in the title remained. This game was featured early in the first season of the 1974 syndicated series.
 Ring That Bell was a recreation of the gameplay of the 1950s version, where contestants buzzed in to guess a tune by running to and ringing a bell. Five tunes were played, and the contestant who correctly guessed the most tunes won the round and 10 points. This game was seen only on the 1974 daytime series.
 Sing-a-Tune, where both contestants guessed the song being sung by house vocalist Kathie Lee Johnson (who replaced any instance of its title in the lyrics with "la-las") by writing down the title. Five tunes were played and the winner of the round received 10 points and a prize package. If contestants were tied, each received the prize package and 5 points. The game was played only during the 1977–78 season, being retired when Johnson left the show.

Bid-a-Note 
Bid-a-Note has typically been the final head-to-head round of the show, except from 1978 to 1981 and during the 1984–85 tournaments, when it was the penultimate round.

After being given a clue towards the song, the two contestants alternate bidding as to how few notes they need to identify it, starting as high as seven. Bidding ends when one contestant challenges the other to name the tune, or a bid of one note is given by a player to end the auction. Correctly identifying the song earns the contestant a point, while missing it gives the point to the opponent. The first to reach three points wins the game.

From 1978 to the end of the Kennedy run, players alternated choosing the tune to be played via displayed numbered packets.

Golden Medley 
The main bonus round of Name That Tune, where the contestant must identify seven tunes within 30 seconds. The champion stops the clock by hitting a buzzer, a cue for the band to stop playing, and can either give an answer or pass if they are not sure. Once all seven tunes are played, the contestant may return to tunes passed if time permits. The game ends when a contestant identifies all seven tunes, runs out of time, or gives an incorrect answer.

On the 1974 daytime series, the winning player had to correctly identify six (later five) tunes. Each correct guess won $200, and $2,000 was awarded if the contestant guessed all six in 30 seconds. No matter what the result of the Golden Medley was, the champion returned the next day and played until they had won five times or had been defeated. Any champion that made it to a fifth day won a car.

Later in the run, corresponding with the change to five tunes, a champion was required to win the Golden Medley in order to return the next day. The car was awarded if the champion successfully completed the Golden Medley four times.

On the Tom Kennedy syndicated series, each tune was worth $500 in cash and/or prizes (usually, a contestant who got six won a car on the nighttime version), and any contestant who named all seven tunes won a $15,000 prize package. On the 1977 daytime version, each tune was worth $250, and all seven won a $2,500 prize package.

The $100,000 Mystery Tune
From 1976 to 1978, Golden Medley winners on the syndicated series were given a chance to win an additional $100,000 in cash at the conclusion of the next week's episode by guessing the $100,000 Mystery Tune. A safe filled with large, sealed manila envelopes was placed in a room backstage, and one envelope was chosen at random; the producers made the choice in 1976, while the contestant did so starting in 1977. Each envelope held the sheet music for a different tune whose title had been blacked out, along with a smaller second envelope containing the title, composer name(s), and copyright/background information for the tune.

Once an envelope was chosen, it was brought onstage by a security guard, who gave the sheet music and the inner envelope to the orchestra's pianist and the host respectively. The contestant entered an isolation booth wired so that they could hear only these two individuals, and the pianist played the tune for 20 seconds. The contestant was then given 10 seconds to offer one guess at the title, which was recorded on audiotape. The host opened the inner envelope and read its contents aloud, after which the contestant's guess was played back and compared against the title. An exact match won $100,000, paid at $10,000 per year for 10 years.

When Name That Tune returned to daytime in 1977, the Mystery Tune round was brought along with it and played according to the same rules as the syndicated version. The prize for correctly naming the tune was a lump sum of $25,000.

On days when the Mystery Tune was played, the front game was abbreviated in order to leave time for it, such as by making Bid-a-Note a best-of-three round instead of best-of-five.

$100,000 Tournaments
In 1977, eleven Golden Medley winners who did not correctly identify the Mystery Tune were invited back to play in a three week tournament where the winner would receive $100,000 in cash and prizes. In the first two weeks, five or six players competed in an otherwise normal game, except that in Melody Roulette, only the first two players to answer two tunes continued. Sing a Tune and Bid a Note were then played for ten points between the remaining two players.

To determine the winner of the match, the Golden Medley became a competitive round of play instead of a bonus round and changed its name to the Golden Medley Showdown. Here, the two contestants tried to identify as many songs as they could within the thirty second time limit; a tune was discarded if neither player buzzed in within five seconds.

The two winners came back on the third week, playing Melody Roulette, Sing a Tune, and Bid a Note for 10 points each, and Golden Medley Showdown for 30, to determine the $100,000 winner. Unlike the mystery tune prize, this $100,000 was in cash and prizes. Runners-up won $2,500.

In 1978, the show (which had switched to a disco set and theme) discarded the Mystery Tunes and the entire season was set up to have four nine-week $100,000 tournaments. The first six weeks consisted of two-player games, featuring Melody Roulette, Bid-a-Note, and Golden Medley Showdown. The six winners returned for a three-week tournament, played like the 1977 tournament, except that three players played Melody Roulette and two of those players played the remaining two games. Every ninth episode would be a tournament final. The winner of each tournament won $10,000 a year for the next ten years, while the runner-up won a car. A number of celebrity specials filled out the season.

1984 version

The show was revived in 1984 as a daily series, with some of the same elements of the '70s version. It launched with a two-week Super Champions tournament featuring fourteen winners from the Kennedy version, then segued into regular competition. Typical episodes featured Melody Roulette and the new game Tune Topics for 10 points each, and Bid-A-Note for 20; the day's winner advanced to the Golden Medley, which if won, qualified the player for a monthly tournament for the grand prize.

(Note: one week of episodes featured a notably different set and theme music, as well as being the only episodes that split the points if a round ended in a tie, rather than playing a tie-breaker tune; they are assumed to be a "pilot week" despite airing later in the season, and will be referred to as such below.)

Melody Roulette: The outer wheel had one Double space (except for the pilot week wheel, which had three). Initially, the wheels were spun before every tune to determine its value, with the inner wheel displaying amounts from $100 to $500 in increments of $100, and only the winner of the round kept their cash. The maximum number of tunes was seven in the earliest episodes, but was reduced to five shortly thereafter. In a further later change, the inner wheel displayed amounts from $250 to $1000 in increments of $250, and one spin determined the award for the winner of the round. The maximum number of tunes was increased back to seven with this change.

Tune Topics: This was the second game of the day on all episodes except for the pilot week. The orchestra would play five tunes with a specific theme. Originally, one topic was exclusively shown, but it was quickly changed to a presentation where one of five categories was shown to be chosen at random; however, it was obvious that the category was simply pre-selected as before. Ten points were given to the contestant who identified the most tunes out of the five.

Tune Countdown: This was the second round for the pilot week, and was basically a 20-second version of the Golden Medley Showdown.

Bid-a-Note played the same, except the players no longer chose the clues by number. Bonus prizes were awarded to the winners of Tune Topics/Countdown and Bid-a-Note.

Golden Medley: Each tune was worth at least $250 in prizes, with an unspecified amount in prizes - usually including a vacation - awarded for naming all seven tunes, along with an entry into the monthly tournament.

$100,000 Tournament: Each tournament episode varied in the number of contestants playing, which depended on how many of them qualified for the tournament. If more than two players were competing on any particular episode, a qualifying round was played in lieu of Melody Roulette, and the first two players to identify two tunes advanced to the next round. The two players then played Tune Topics and Bid-a-Note for 10 points each and the Golden Medley Showdown for 20. For games with two players, they played Melody Roulette and Tune Topics for 10 points each, Bid-a-Note for 20, and the Golden Medley Showdown for 40. The player with the most points at the end of the Golden Medley Showdown advanced in the tournament, with a sudden death tune played if necessary. The winner of each month's tournament final received $10,000 in cash and $90,000 in prizes, while the runner-up won a vacation package for two.

For several weeks of non-tournament shows in late 1984, a "Home Viewer Sweepstakes" was held. The day's winner picked a name out of a drum, then randomly selected one of the above prizes. A Golden Medley win by the contestant earned that prize for the home viewer.

2021 version 
Each hour-long episode consists of two complete games, with two new contestants per game playing for cash through two rounds. In each round, an incorrect response by one contestant gives the opponent a chance to steal the money. Bid-a-Note is always played as the second round; the high scorer at its end keeps their entire winnings total and advances to the Golden Medley for a chance to win up to $100,000 more. Tunes in all first-round games are played as toss-ups, open for either contestant to buzz in; one tune also awards a bonus prize, which the contestant keeps regardless of the final outcome of the game.

Lyrics are sung in the first round, except for those that constitute the title. Six or seven tunes are played in each game, with each worth $1,000 (in the first season, tunes increased from $1,000-$6,000). Some tunes missed by both contestants are edited out of the program.

The rotating first-round games include:

 By Request: A contestant chooses one category from a list of six or more, and a tune fitting it is played. The one who correctly names it gets to choose the next category, with the just-used one removed from the list.
 Mixtape: All tunes fit a single topic given by the host.
On Shuffle: Contestants must name one tune by each of six different artists, chosen at random from a displayed list. Each artist is identified and removed from the list only after the tune has been named.
Remix'd: Contestants must name a series of pop tunes as they are performed in a range of different styles. After a tune is correctly named, the house band performs it in its original style.
Spin Me Round: An electronic wheel is spun before each turn to choose one of nine musical genres, and a tune from that genre is played.
 Title Track: Contestants must name tunes fitting a topic given by the host. Two topics are played, each with three tunes.
 Blank That Blank (introduced in season 3): A portion of the title for each tune is given before it is played.

Bid-a-Note is played second, with a maximum bid of 10 notes. If the low bidder misses, the opponent gets to hear all notes before responding (rather than scoring by default as before). Four tunes are played, with the first one worth $5,000 and the value increasing by $5,000 per subsequent tune up to $20,000 ($10,000 - $25,000 in season 1).

The high scorer advances to the Golden Medley, played as in earlier versions, with seven tunes to be named in 30 seconds and no vocals. The contestant wins $10,000 for each of the first six correct responses and an additional $40,000 for the seventh, for a top prize of $100,000. A wrong answer at any time ends the round; the contestant may pass on a tune and return to it after hearing all seven if time permits. (In celebrity episodes, a wrong answer does not end the game, but does eliminate the ability to win the full $100,000.)

Broadcast history 
Name That Tune ran in prime time from 1953 to 1954 on NBC, with Red Benson hosting. It moved to CBS in Fall 1954, and hosting was taken up by Bill Cullen. George DeWitt took over in Fall 1955 until the end of its run in October 1959. Notable contestants during this period included the young singer Leslie Uggams and child actor Eddie Hodges who were followed by Betty Leary, a popular contestant whose 12 children filled the first row in the TV studio theater for seven consecutive shows.  The series finished at #30 in the Nielsen ratings for the 1956–57 season. On October 18, 1959, CBS cancelled Tune in the wake of the quiz show scandals; its final episode aired on October 19, 1959.

Richard Hayes also emceed a local edition from 1970 to 1971, which ran for 26 weeks in a small number of markets.

In 1974, the best-remembered syndicated Name That Tune premiered, hosted by Tom Kennedy, and produced by Ralph Edwards in association with Sandy Frank Productions; it would become The $100,000 Name That Tune in 1976 and continue until 1981.

Also in 1974, NBC picked up a weekday version of Name That Tune for its daytime lineup, which ran from July 29, 1974 to January 3, 1975, and was hosted by Dennis James. A second iteration of the daytime version, this time hosted by Kennedy, ran on NBC from January 3 to June 10, 1977 (replacing the Kennedy-hosted and Andrews-produced 50 Grand Slam in its timeslot). Both were lower-paying versions of the concurrent syndicated version.

The New $100,000 Name That Tune returned to syndication as a weekday series in 1984, hosted by Jim Lange and produced by Sandy Frank. It lasted one season.

Episode status 
The 1950s version was likely wiped, given network practices. The March 10, 1955, episode (with Bill Cullen) and a highlight episode from the final season (with Johnny Olson announcing) are known to exist. Episodes from 1954, 1956, and 1957 are held by the Paley Center for Media.

The status of the locally produced Richard Hayes series and the NBC daytime series hosted by Dennis James and Tom Kennedy are unknown. It is unclear whether any of the stations that aired Hayes' version kept their tapes, but the James and daytime Kennedy versions were likely destroyed given NBC's practices that continued into 1980. A clip from a James episode was used in a 1988 "Game Show Hosts Special" episode of FOX's The Late Show, and a full episode from December 26 was discovered in February 2010, and uploaded to YouTube by James' son Brad in October 2019.

The syndicated Kennedy run is intact. Since producer Ralph Edwards' death, the episodes are in the possession of his estate.

The 1984 syndicated series is fully intact and was rerun on American television on a fairly heavy basis for almost a decade. Christian Broadcasting Network (now Freeform) was the first to air reruns of the series, from September 2, 1985, to August 29, 1986. USA Network picked it up on January 2, 1989, and ran it until September 13, 1991. It then returned to the renamed  The Family Channel (again, now Freeform), which aired it from June 7, 1993, to March 29, 1996. Prestige Entertainment Group, the format's current distributor, holds the rights to the syndicated Kennedy and Lange versions.

20 episodes of the 1984-85 version were added to the streaming service Tubi in June 2021.

Later pilots 
A pilot was hosted by Peter Allen in 1990; it was co-produced by Marty Pasetta and Orion Television, and used gameplay that varies greatly from any previous versions of the show. Although not picked up as a series in the U.S., this format did eventually air in New Zealand under the title Face the Music.

An attempt to revive the show in 2001 with producer Phil Gurin fell through. This would have been "a game-variety hybrid," such as incorporating live performances.

In October 2006, CBS ordered a pilot for a revival with Donny Osmond as host, but it was not picked up for a series order. This attempt would have included a new bonus round where contestants guessed 15 songs in 60 seconds for a shot at $1 million.

In October 2007, it was reported that MTV Networks had bought the rights to the series and planned to create concurrent versions of the show to air on MTV, VH1 and CMT in 2008. Their musical content was to be tailored to the networks' respective formats and audiences (for example, the CMT version would have focused on country music), and the show was to be "[reinterpreted] for the digital age" with new online elements. None of these efforts ultimately made it to air.

In March 2012, it was reported that FremantleMedia had bought the rights and planned to revive the series. However, that plan never came to fruition.

In October 2017, CBS ordered another pilot for a revival, this time with Elizabeth Banks as host. However, it was not ordered to series.

2021 revival 
In October 2020, it was reported that Eureka Productions and current rightsholder Prestige Entertainment were preparing to begin production of a new version of Name That Tune in Sydney, Australia for an unspecified network, with American Australians as contestants. It was filmed with a studio audience under local COVID-19 protocols. Filming began on November 17 at ICC Sydney.

On November 18, 2020, Fox officially announced the series, with actress Jane Krakowski as host and former American Idol judge Randy Jackson as bandleader. Premiering on January 6, 2021 to accompany the Masked Singer spin-off The Masked Dancer on its Wednesday-night lineup, the series co-exists on Fox's programming slate with its similar series Beat Shazam. It was co-produced by Eureka, Prestige, and Fox Alternative Entertainment.

A second season premiered on March 29, 2022, which primarily features celebrity episodes. Production was moved to Dublin, Ireland at the RDS and Font Hill Studios. with BiggerStage (which had previously collaborated with Fox Alternative Entertainment on its new talent show format The Big Deal) replacing Eureka as co-production partner.

A third season titled Celebrity Name That Tune premiered on January 11, 2023.

International versions

UK

Germany
Hast du Töne? (Do you have sound?), hosted by Matthias Opdenhövel, aired daily on VOX from 1999 to 2001. Gameplay was somewhat different from the U.S. version, but the final round was the same as the Golden Medley.

Russia
Ugaday Melodiyu (Guess the Tune), hosted by Valdis Pelšs, aired daily on Channel One Russia from 1995 to 1999. It was produced by the VIDigital. The version was presented like the German version. Later, the series was presented as Ugadai i kompaniya (Guess and company) called Ugadaika (Guessing), by Pelsh also, but it was not as successful as the first version. In 2003, the program was revived and aired for two years on Channel One Russia. Gameplay remained the same and the only difference was the size of prizes.

On 2 January 2013, the program was once again revived, and since 2017, it has been aired during winter holidays. Starting from January 2023, the show continues to air without Fremantle's involvement in the production due to Russia's invasion of Ukraine.

Brazil
Qual é a Música? ("What Song Is It?" or "Which Song Is It?"), hosted by Silvio Santos, has been a hit on Sistema Brasileiro de Televisao for the past two decades. The show is currently placed on hiatus.

Italy
Il Musichiere (The Musician) aired on Saturdays from 1957 to 1960 on the then-called National Program, but it ended after the conductor Mario Riva accidentally fell from the stadium and subsequently died. Sarabanda (Sarabanda), aired from 1997 to 2004 and 2005 on Italia 1 and presented by Enrico Papi, in 2009 on Canale 5 by Teo Mammucari with participation of Belen Rodriguez and in 2017 again on Italia 1 with the return of Enrico Papi, in some games he was inspired by the 70s and 80s versions of Name That Tune. Name That Tune – Indovina la canzone is on air from September 2020 on TV8 in the first two editions with Papi, replaced in the third by Ciro Priello with the participation of Fabio Balsamo (both members of the comedy group of The Jackal), focuses on the challenge between two teams of famous people in Italy. This formula mixes the variety and the quiz.

Poland
Jaka to melodia (What tune is that?) airs 7 days a week on TVP1 and was first broadcast on September 4, 1997. The program was hosted from 1997 to 2018 by Robert Janowski, an actor and singer. From September 1, 2018 to June 12, 2019, the program was hosted by Norbi, but on September 7, 2019, that role was taken over by Rafał Brzozowski.

The show is noted for starting and ending each episode with a musical performance by either the in-house band and singers, guests, or sometimes both. Performances also occur at random points throughout the show, usually after a correct answer. These performances are usually shorter in length than the proper song's length to accommodate a 30-minute time slot. The game is played entirely for cash, with the show's winner playing for 10,000 zloty. During the final of the month/year, the game is played entirely for cash, with the show's winner playing the Golden Medley for 80,000 zloty. On some occasions, the host of the show will sing.

Vietnam
The Vietnamese version was called Nốt nhạc vui (Happy Notes). 272 episodes of the show aired from January 14, 2004, to March 25, 2009. It became popular and was among the most-watched TV series of Ho Chi Minh City Television. Thanh Bạch is the host of that version.

Name That Video 

Name That Video was a variation of the series that aired in 2001 on VH1. The show was hosted by Karyn Bryant and featured contestants competing to name song titles by viewing the music video. The show's credits note the use of Name That Tune (Video) by permission.

Merchandise

Arcade game 
In 1986, a coin-operated arcade game based on the 1984 version of the show was released by Bally/Sente Technologies, created by Owen Rubin. The show's bandleader, Tommy Oliver, was hired as the game's music consultant. The player's task was to guess the tune being played from among four choices. It also featured a two-player mode.

While playable, critics and players considered the machine's difficulty to be high due to the technical limits of the very basic synthesized music the machine was capable of generating, and songs being too difficult to name mostly because the wrong audience was targeted as teenage players of the arcade era simply weren't interested in trying to name songs from the 1940s through the 1970s. Critics also believed the game would have served better as a tabletop unit for bars and other adult-oriented entertainment establishments instead of as an arcade game.

The game only utilized three of the six games shown in the 1984 version of the show, Tune Topics, Bid-a-Note, and The Golden Medley. The game required the player to score 18,000 points, playing five tunes apiece in the Tune Topics and Bid-a-Note rounds. In Tune Topics, the player scored up to 990 points per tune based on how quickly they named it. In Bid-a-Note, the value of each tune was determined by how many notes the player requested, starting at 100 for nine and increasing by 100 for each note below that threshold (to a maximum of 900 for one). For both rounds, the player had to correctly name at least three out of five tunes in order to score a bonus that started at 9,900 points and counted down throughout the round.

If the player failed to score at least 18,000 points after both rounds, the game ended immediately. Reaching this minimum allowed the player to enter the Golden Medley, with the goal of naming five tunes in 15 seconds. Each tune had three choices instead of four; the fourth button could be used to pass. Tunes were scored as in Tune Topics, and successfully completing the round awarded a bonus as in the other two rounds. If time ran out or the player made an incorrect guess, the game ended and the bonus was forfeited.

Sente had developed several different upgrade chips for the game containing different musical selections and game modes, but it is unknown if they were shelved or destroyed as the game was a flop.

Video game 
A game based on the show was released for the short-lived CD-i home console. This version was hosted by Bob Goen and was based on the unsold 1990 Peter Allen version of the show.

Mobile phone game 
In 2003, a mobile phone version of the game appeared on major U.S. cellular providers. The game follows the traditional format, with MIDI interpretations of popular and classic music played in short clips. The player then has several seconds to correctly identify the tune. Prizes such as free ringtones were available, a first in the mobile industry. The game is often mentioned as a pioneer in the emerging wireless entertainment industry.

DVD games 
In 2005, Imagination Games released a DVD game called Name That Tune: 80s Edition. The DVD game featured elements from the TV show, as well as Name That Video, like the Bid-A-Vid round.

In 2007, Imagination Games re-released Name That Tune: 80s Edition, under the new name Name That Tune Eighties.

References

External links
Harry Salter papers at the University of Wyoming – American Heritage Center
Name That Tune (1953 version) on IMDb
Name That Tune (1974 daytime version) on IMDb
Name That Tune (1974 syndicated version) on IMDb
Name That Tune (1977 daytime version) on IMDb
Name That Tune (1984 version) on IMDb
Name That Tune (2021 version) on IMDb
 

1950s American game shows
1950s American radio programs
1950s Australian game shows
1953 American television series debuts
1956 Australian television series debuts
1957 Australian television series endings
1959 American television series endings
1970 American television series debuts
1970s American game shows
1970s Australian game shows
1971 American television series endings
1974 American television series debuts
1975 Australian television series debuts
1975 Australian television series endings
1980s American game shows
1981 American television series endings
1984 American television series debuts
1985 American television series endings
2020s American game shows
2021 American television series debuts
American television series revived after cancellation
Black-and-white American television shows
Black-and-white Australian television shows
CBS original programming
First-run syndicated television programs in the United States
Fox Broadcasting Company original programming
Guessing games
Musical game shows
NBC original programming
NBC radio programs
Television series by Eureka
Television series by Fox Entertainment
Television series by Ralph Edwards Productions
Television shows filmed in Australia
Television shows filmed in the Republic of Ireland